The first round matches of the 2006–07 UEFA Cup were played on 14 and 28 September 2006, which narrowed clubs down to 40 teams in preparation for the group stage.

Summary

|}
4Due to the armed conflict in Israel, UEFA had ruled that European tournament matches could not be played in Israel until further notice. Maccabi Haifa's home leg on 14 September was moved to Nijmegen, Netherlands. On 15 September, UEFA lifted the ban, allowing future matches to be played in the Tel Aviv area. Hapoel Tel Aviv were able to play their home leg in Tel Aviv on 28 September.

5UEFA ordered Trabzonspor's home leg on 14 September to be played behind closed doors after objects were thrown at visiting fans and the fourth official, and a smoke bomb ignited in the stands, during their second qualifying round home leg against Cypriots APOEL. Trabzonspor appealed, and UEFA rejected the appeal on 13 September. Trabzonspor's penalty includes a second closed-doors game, a penalty which has been deferred for two years and will be removed if no further incidents occur.

First leg

Second leg

Odense won 3-2 on aggregate.

Mladá Boleslav won 4-3 on aggregate.

Nancy won 3-2 on aggregate.

Lens won 3-1 on aggregate.

Eintracht Frankfurt won 6-2 on aggregate.

Hapoel Tel Aviv won 3-1 on aggregate.

Parma won 2-0 on aggregate.

Beşiktaş won 4-3 on aggregate.

Livorno won 3-0 on aggregate.

Heerenveen won 3-0 on aggregate.

Zulte Waregem won 3-2 on aggregate.

AZ won 4-3 on aggregate.

Dinamo București won 8-4 on aggregate.

Grasshopper won 8-0 on aggregate.

Basel won 7-2 on aggregate.

Auxerre won 5-2 on aggregate.

2-2 on aggregate. Feyenoord won on away goals rule.

Maccabi Haifa won 4-2 on aggregate.

Slovan Liberec won 4-1 on aggregate.

Partizan won 4-3 on aggregate.

Panathinaikos won 2-1 on aggregate.

Newcastle United won 3-1 on aggregate.

Fenerbahçe won 5-1 on aggregate.

Club Brugge won 2-1 on aggregate.

Bayer Leverkusen won 3-1 on aggregate.

Wisła Kraków won 2-1 on aggregate.

Braga won 3-2 on aggregate.

Rangers won 2-0 on aggregate.

Austria Wien won 2-1 on aggregate.

Blackburn Rovers won 4-2 on aggregate.

2-2 on aggregate. Osasuna won on away goals rule.

Palermo won 4-0 on aggregate.

Ajax won 9-2 on aggregate.

Celta Vigo won 4-0 on aggregate.

Paris Saint-Germain won 2-0 on aggregate.

Sparta Prague won 2-0 on aggregate.

Rapid București won 3–1 on aggregate.

Tottenham Hotspur won 2-0 on aggregate.

Sevilla won 6-1 on aggregate.

Espanyol won 5-3 on aggregate.

Notes

References

External links
2006–07 All matches UEFA Cup – season at UEFA website

2006–07 UEFA Cup
September 2006 sports events in Europe
UEFA Cup qualifying rounds